Les amitiés particulières (English: Special Friendships) is a 1964 film adaptation of the Roger Peyrefitte novel of the same name, directed by Jean Delannoy. It was released in 1967 with English subtitles as This Special Friendship. It stars Francis Lacombrade and Didier Haudepin as boys at an upper-class Catholic boarding school, whose chaste but intimate friendship is discouraged as sinful by the priests (played by Louis Seigner, Michel Bouquet, and Lucien Nat), leading to the younger boy's suicide.

Plot 

The movie is mostly true to the novel, changing only relatively minor plot points such as Alexandre's suicide from poisoning to death by throwing himself from a train. Also, Alexandre in the movie is brown-haired, not blond, which also removes some of the inside jokes between Alexandre and Georges present in the book.

Cast 
  as Georges de Sarre
 Didier Haudepin as Alexandre Motier
 François Leccia as Lucien Rouvère
 Gérard Chambre as André Ferron
 Dominique Maurin as Marc de Blajan
 Louis Seigner as Le père Lauzon/Father Lauzon
 Michel Bouquet as Le père de Trennes/Father Trennes
 Lucien Nat as Le père supérieur/Father Superior

Production 

The film was produced by Christine Gouze-Rénal, whose sister Danielle was the wife of future French president François Mitterrand. The filming location for the movie was the 13th-century Royaumont Abbey, some 50 km north of Paris.

Although the characters of Georges and Alexandre are 14 and 12 years old, respectively, Lacombrade and Haudepin were 21 and 12 years old at the time of filming.

During filming, Peyrefitte, who was 57 years old at the time, met 12-year-old aristocrat Alain-Philippe Malagnac d'Argens de Villèle, who had been cast in a minor role as a choir boy. The two developed a personal and professional relationship which continued for years afterward.

Reception 

James Travers of Filmsdefrance.com gave the film four out of five stars, writing: "The arresting performances from Francis Lacombrade (remarkably his one and only film credit) and child actor Didier Haudepin bring to the film a kind of raw edge, poetry and spiritual intensity that is rare, even in French love films...Whilst Les Amitiés particulières stands as a powerful, deeply moving love story, it is actually far more than that. It is a pretty direct assault on the double standards and hypocrisies of contemporary society, which is forever governed by prejudice, petty rules and double standards."

The film was an inspiration for the manga The Heart of Thomas by Moto Hagio. Hagio was persuaded to see the film in the summer of 1970, and in November 1971, published the first 40 pages of the manga in Shojo Comic.

Soundtrack
 Pange lingua (choir)
 J.S. Bach: Invention No.13 in A minor, BWV 784 (piano)
 Alouette, gentille Alouette (train scene)

References

External links
 
 Stills from the movie
  Four-minute making-of at INA
 
 Schoolboy Sins—1967 Time magazine review of the movie 

1964 films
1960s French-language films
French LGBT-related films
Teen LGBT-related films
Films directed by Jean Delannoy
Films based on French novels
Rail transport films
Films about suicide
1964 LGBT-related films
Films with screenplays by Jean Aurenche
Films with screenplays by Pierre Bost
Films set in boarding schools
1960s French films